General elections were held in Samoa on 2 March 2001 to determine the composition of the 13th Parliament. Prime minister Tuilaʻepa Saʻilele Malielegaoi led the Human Rights Protection Party (HRPP) into the election. Opposition leader and former prime minister and future head of state, Tui Ātua Tupua Tamasese Efi led the Samoan National Development Party (SNDP) into the election.
The HRPP won 23 seats, but initially fell short of a majority. The SNDP won 13 seats, the Samoan United People's Party secured one seat and the remaining 12 were won by independents. Following the election, all 12 independents joined the HRPP, giving the party a majority in parliament and allowing Tuila'epa to remain prime minister.

Background
During the previous general election held in 1996, the Human Rights Protection Party won the most seats but fell short of a majority. The opposition Samoan National Development Party won 11 seats; the Samoa Liberal party secured a single seat, and independents won the remaining seats. The incumbent HRPP government remained in power due to the support of 10 independent MPs.

The HRPP government altered the constitution in 1997 to change the position of chief auditor from life tenure until age 60 to a term of three years. The ruling party also made alterations so that removing the chief auditor required only a simple majority vote in the legislative assembly, as opposed to a two-thirds majority as had been the case prior. This action occurred after chief auditor Su'a Rimoni Ah Chong exposed widespread corruption within the HRPP government in 1994, resulting in his suspension and eventual dismissal the following year.

Tofilau's government changed the country’s name from 'Western Samoa' to 'Samoa' in 1997. The change sparked controversy and drew criticism, particularly from individuals in American Samoa. They argued that the modification threatened their identity and continued referring to the Independent State of Samoa as 'Western Samoa'.

Prior to the election, in 1998 prime minister and HRPP leader Tofilau Eti Alesana resigned due to ill health. Tofilau was succeeded by deputy prime minister Tuilaʻepa Saʻilele Malielegaoi, and died the following year.

Electoral system

During the time of the 2001 election, Samoa's parliament, the legislative assembly, was composed of 49 seats, with each member serving a five year term. Thirty-five members were elected from single-member constituencies, six constituencies elected two members, whilst the other two were elected through individual voters, mostly non-ethnic Samoans and individuals with partial Samoan ancestry. Candidates were elected using the First-past-the-post voting system. Only Matai (Chiefs) were permitted to contest any of the 47 constituencies, whilst the other two seats were open to all individuals. The controversial Electoral Amendment act, which came into effect in 2000, required candidates to have resided in Samoa for at least three years to qualify as a candidate. Previously, the requirement was 12 months. Civil servants were not allowed to run.

Voters 

The government introduced Universal suffrage in 1991, granting Samoan citizens aged 21 and older the right to vote. Voters could elect to enrol in a constituency rather than the one where they reside by right of significant family ties or matai titles. As a result, the population of constituencies and the constituency's voter roll have not always correlated. Cabinet amended the 1963 electoral act in August 2000, establishing the register of voters as a separate entity from the legislative assembly. The 2001 election was the first in which it was compulsory for all eligible individuals to register to vote. The new register of voters commenced the enrollment of electors in October 2000. There were only two registration centres where individuals could enrol or update their details, with one each at Mulinu'u on Upolu and Savai’i. Due to the centres being severely understaffed, the process was reportedly chaotic, with long queues, and many voters waited for several hours. One person died while in line, and several fights broke out due to discontent over the process. As a result, health minister Misa Telefoni Retzlaff unsuccessfully called for the election's postponement. At the closure of voter registration on 19 January 2001, a total of 92,788 voters were registered.

Overseas voting 

Although more Samoans resided outside Samoa than in the country around the time of the election, the HRPP government refused to entertain overseas voting. Prime Minister Tuila‘epa expressed his opposition to allowing "outsiders" to participate in the electoral process and said that "they (Samoans abroad) don’t understand, and they don’t feel the pain serving Samoa day in and day out." The prime minister also stated that if overseas ballots were allowed, "Parliament might as well be moved from Mulinu'u to Canberra." The opposition leader Tui Ātua Tupua Tamasese Efi, opposed the government's decision due to the Samoan diaspora's significant contribution to the economy through remittance funds.

Schedule 

On the advice of the prime minister, the O le Ao o le Malo (head of state), Malietoa Tanumafili II, signed a declaration on 22 January 2001, ordering the dissolution of the 12th Parliament, which went into effect the following day. Voter registration closed on 19 January. The O le Ao o le Malo issued the writ for the election on 30 January. The deadline for candidates to register or withdraw was on 16 February, and the return of the writ occurred on 18 March.

Campaign
A total of four parties contested the election: the HRPP, SNDP, the Samoan United People’s Party and the Samoa All People’s party.

The HRPP campaigned on increasing foreign aid to improve the country’s infrastructure. The party also announced its intentions to boost the economy and improve the health and education sectors. Prime minister Tuilaʻepa claimed that the opposition SNDP could not provide a credible alternative to the HRPP and the Samoan people. The SNDP platform focused on reforming the government and ceasing corruption. Opposition leader Tui Ātua proposed that a special task force be established to end corruption within the government. He also blamed the HRPP administration for the mishandling of the state-owned Polynesian Airlines, which he claimed led to an increase in the nation’s debt. The SNDP also denounced the government for a scandal revealed in 1997 involving the illegal sale of Samoan passports to citizens of China and Taiwan. The party carried out weekly press conferences criticising the government. Tuilaʻepa predicted that the HRPP would retain power.

Results

The final results showed no party obtained a majority; the HRPP won a plurality of 23 seats. The SNDP won 13 seats, one SUPP member was elected, and independents secured 12 seats. One candidate was elected unopposed, and only three seats were won by women, whilst two cabinet ministers lost re-election.

By constituency

Double member constituencies

Uncontested

One candidate was elected unopposed:

Aftermath
Following the election, four independents joined the HRPP, permitting it to remain in government. Three of these new HRPP members had pledged to join the party if they were victorious, while one had intended to join whichever party won the most seats. Shortly after, health minister and former attorney-general Misa Telefoni Retzlaff was elected deputy leader of the HRPP by party members and subsequently became deputy prime minister. Both positions had been vacant since Tuila‘epa assumed office as prime minister in 1998. Tuila‘epa expressed that the appointment undercut rumours that Misa intended to leave the HRPP and form a new opposition party. Five cabinet ministers lost reelection.

Following the election, the opposition SNDP demanded a second recount in 20 constituencies. They claimed that the initial vote tally and the original recount were flawed. Tui Ātua Tupua Tamasese Efi resigned as leader of both the opposition and the SNDP. Le Mamea Ropati MP for Lefaga & Falese'ela replaced him.

The O le Ao o le Malo, Malietoa Tanumafili II, officially opened the 13th parliamentary session on 19 March 2001.

Notes

See also
List of members of the Legislative Assembly of Samoa (2001–2006)

References

Elections in Samoa
Samoa
General
Samoa
Election and referendum articles with incomplete results